The Taiwan High Prosecutors Office (THPO) is located in Taipei, Taiwan. The territorial jurisdiction covers the jurisdictions of Taipei, Shilin, New Taipei, Taoyuan, Hsinchu, Keelung and Yilan District Prosecutors Offices. It has branch offices in Taipei, Tainan, Kaohsiung, Hualien and Taichung. It is one of the two high prosecutors offices in Taiwan (the Republic of China).

The prosecutorial system runs parallel to its court system.  As such, the jurisdiction of the THPO and its branch offices covers only Taiwan and its islands. Kinmen, Wuchiu and Matsu fall under the jurisdiction of the Kinmen Branch of the Fukien High Prosecutors Office. At whatever level, the prosecutors work under the unitary command of the Prosecutor-General of the Supreme Prosecutors Office.

General 
According to the Law Governing Organization of Courts, prosecutors’ offices form part of the court at the same level of trial: the Supreme Court has a prosecutors’ office with a number of prosecutors, of whom one is appointed as Prosecutor-General; each of the other High Courts or District Courts have its own prosecutors’ office with a number of prosecutors, of whom one is appointed as the chief prosecutor. The Law Governing Organization of Courts and the Statute Governing Judicial Personnel Administration also state that the qualifications of prosecutors are identical to that of judges. Both of them possess the status of judicial officials. Prosecutors are appointed from those persons who have passed the Examination of Judicial Officials, complete the Training Course for Judicial Officials and possess distinguished records after a term of practice.

Territorial Jurisdiction 
The Taiwan High Prosecutors Office in Taipei:

Taipei, Shilin, New Taipei, Taoyuan, Hsinchu, Keelung, and Yilan District Prosecutors Office

The Branches:

(1) Taichung Branch of Taiwan High Prosecutors Office

Taiwan Miaoli, Taichung, Changhua and Nantou District Prosecutors Offices

(2) Tainan Branch of Taiwan High Prosecutors Office

Taiwan Yunlin, Chiayi, Tainan District Prosecutors Offices

(3) Kaohsiung Branch of Taiwan High Prosecutors Office

Taiwan Kaohsiung, Pingtung, Penghu District Prosecutors Offices

(4) Hualien Branch of Taiwan High Prosecutors Office

Taiwan Hualien, Taitung District Prosecutors Offices

Functions 
1. Review of non-prosecution decisions

2. Trial attendance

3. Review of criminal judgments

4. Enforcement of criminal judgments of last resort

5. Review of post-mortem forensic examination cases

6. A Platform for prosecutorial interaction

7. Assistance in prisoner rehabilitation and victim protection affairs

8. Public service

See also 

 History of law in Taiwan
 Law of Taiwan
 Six Codes
 Constitution of the Republic of China
 Judicial Yuan
 Supreme Court of the Republic of China
 High Court (Taiwan)
 District Courts (Taiwan)
 Ministry of Justice (Taiwan)
 Supreme Prosecutors Office
 List of law schools in Taiwan

References

External links 
Taiwan Law Resources
The Judicial Yuan
The Ministry of Justice
Taiwan High Prosecutors Office website
Taipei District Prosecutors Office
Legislative Yuan
Executive Yuan

Law of Taiwan
Law enforcement agencies of Taiwan
Prosecution